Mike McCullough may refer to:

 Mike McCullough (golfer) (born 1945), American golfer 
 Mike McCullough (Canadian football) (born 1980), Canadian football linebacker
 Mike McCullough (politician), former member of the Ohio House of Representatives
 Michael McCullough (psychologist), American professor of psychology
 Michael McCullough (entrepreneur), American entrepreneur and investor